Gomtuiyeh (also Romanized as Gomtū’īyeh; also known as Gombatū’īyeh and Gonbatū’īyeh) is a village in Bezenjan Rural District, in the Central District of Baft County, Kerman Province, Iran. At the 2006 census, its population was 29, in 10 families.

References 

Populated places in Baft County